Henri Fin (born 20 March 1950) is a former French cyclist. He competed in the team time trial at the 1972 Summer Olympics.

References

External links
 

1950 births
Living people
French male cyclists
Olympic cyclists of France
Cyclists at the 1972 Summer Olympics
Sportspeople from Nord (French department)
Cyclists from Hauts-de-France
20th-century French people